"Little Red Corvette" is a song by American recording artist Prince. The song combines a Linn LM-1 beat and slow synth buildup with a rock chorus, over which Prince, using several automobile metaphors, recalls a one-night stand with a beautiful promiscuous woman. Backing vocals were performed by Lisa Coleman and Dez Dickerson; Dickerson also performs a guitar solo on the song.

Released in 1983 as the second single from 1999, the song was, at that point, Prince's highest charting and his first to reach the top 10 in the U.S., peaking at number 6 on the Billboard Hot 100. It was also his first single to perform better on the pop chart than the R&B chart. Later, it was rereleased as a double A-side with "1999", peaking at number two on the UK Singles Chart in January 1985. Following Prince's death in April 2016, "Little Red Corvette" re-charted on the Billboard Hot 100 at number 29, rising to number 20 the following week. It has sold more than 900,000 copies in the United States.

The initial US single was backed with album track "All the Critics Love U in New York", while UK releases featured "Lady Cab Driver" or "Horny Toad". An extended dance remix of "Little Red Corvette," featured on some 12" releases, was later featured on the 2006 compilation Ultimate.

Composition 
"Little Red Corvette" is written in the key of D major and moves at a tempo of 123 beats per minute in common time. Prince's vocals span from A2 to D7 in the song. The lyrics use car imagery as a double entendre for sex, also making use of horse-related imagery for similar purposes.  For this reason the song has been rated as "Explicit" (E) on the audio streaming service Spotify.

Jack Hamilton of Slate noted that the song is about "ambivalence, vulnerability, and fear" of casual sex. "It’s not about sex as fun...but rather about the entirety of the act: its physical, emotional, psychological, even spiritual dimensions. And uniquely, 'Little Red Corvette' isn’t really about anything other than sex." With its instrumentation of guitars, synthesizers, and a drum machine, Hamilton  identifies "Little Red Corvette" as a post-disco song "in every respect."

Reception
Cash Box said that "a Vangelis-like synth bottom provides the smokey mood, while Prince’s vocals traverse from the plaintive to the depraved."  Billboard called it "a typically racy rock number, thick with electronics" and said that Prince's urgent vocal performance "makes even the more innocent lyrics sound illicit."

Music video
"Little Red Corvette" (directed by Bryan Greenberg and released in February 1983) was  Prince's second music video played on MTV. The first was "1999" the previous year before Michael Jackson's "Billie Jean" and after Musical Youth's "Pass the Dutchie".

Origins
Prince got the idea for the song when he dozed off in band member Lisa Coleman's 1964 pink Mercury Montclair Marauder after an exhausting all-night recording session. The lyrics came to him in bits and pieces during this and other catnaps. Eventually, he was able to finish it without sleeping.

Awards and accolades
 Rolling Stone ranked the song #109 on its list of the 500 Greatest Songs of All Time(2004).
 Dickerson's guitar solo was ranked #64 all time by readers of Guitar World.
 On Acclaimed Music the song is ranked the 179th greatest of all time as well as the third best of 1982.

Personnel 

 Prince – lead and backing vocals, lead guitar, bass guitar, synthesizers, electronic drums, Linn LM-1
 Dez Dickerson – guitar solo and backing vocals
 Lisa Coleman – backing vocals

Charts

Weekly charts

Year-end charts

Certifications

References

 Uptown: The Vault – The Definitive Guide to the Musical World of Prince: Nilsen Publishing 2004, 

1982 songs
1983 singles
Funk songs
Prince (musician) songs
Song recordings produced by Prince (musician)
Songs about cars
Songs about casual sex
Songs written by Prince (musician)
Warner Records singles
Chevrolet Corvette